Fargh Zayer (also Romanized as Fargh Zāyer) is a village in Jaffal Rural District, in the Central District of Shadegan County, Khuzestan Province, Iran. At the 2006 census, its population was 641, in 110 families.

References 

Populated places in Shadegan County